Bheemakaaya is the first novel written by S.L. Bhyrappa, it got published on 1952. Bheemakaaya means giant, massive, and this book is about a wrestler and his life. Bhyrappa was 18 years old when he wrote this article.

References

20th-century Indian novels
Kannada novels
1952 novels
1952 Indian novels
Novels by S. L. Bhyrappa